Ljubiša Ćosić (born 2 October 1979 in Sarajevo) is a Bosnian Serb politician. 

Ćosić has a master's degree in economics and is a PhD student at the University of Banja Luka. Ćosić worked as interpreter for the OSCE, and as intern at the Parliamentary Assembly of Bosnia and Herzegovina and at the National Democratic Institute in Washington, DC. He then worked for the Sarajevo Regional Development Agency (SERDA, 2004-06) and the State Investigation and Protection Agency of BiH (SIPA, 2006-08). He served as an advisor to the Minister of Foreign Trade and Economic Relations of Bosnia and Herzegovina Mladen Zirojević (SNSD, 2008-11), and as an advisor for economic issues to the Serb member of the Presidency of Bosnia and Herzegovina, Nebojša Radmanović (SNSD, 2011-12).

Ćosić was elected mayor of the municipality of East New Sarajevo in 2012 and 2016. Since March 2017, he is President of the Association of Municipalities and Cities of Republika Srpska. In October 2020, at the first direct elections for the post, he was elected Mayor of the City of East Sarajevo, covering six suburban municipalities in the Republika Srpska entity (pop: 61,516 in 2013).

Ćosić is known in East Sarajevo with the nickname "Komšo" (neighbour). This is because he is alleged to issue building permits as thief for any piece of land, parks included, with the proviso that one of the apartments be registered under his own name or of one of his close relatives. He has therefore acquired a big real estate portfolio in East Sarajevo, which are then rented out.

Ćosić was accused of conflict of interest for awarding a contract for the renovation of the local health clinic for 456,000 KM (circa 225,000 EUR) to the building company Marvel owned by his party colleague Savo Lalović. Blogger Slobodan Vaskovic accused him of being close to arms dealer Alija Delimustafić; Ćosić denied knowing him.

Notes

External links 
 Mayor, City of East Sarajevo

Politicians of Republika Srpska
Politicians from Sarajevo
Alliance of Independent Social Democrats politicians
1979 births
Living people